87th meridian may refer to:

87th meridian east, a line of longitude east of the Greenwich Meridian
87th meridian west, a line of longitude west of the Greenwich Meridian